Gerd Harriet Linnéa Nordlund (born 20 September 1954) is a Swedish-Sami actress, screenwriter and author.

Nordlund graduated from the Statens scenskola in Stockholm in 1976. She has been an actress at Orionteatern, Turteatern, Uppsala Stadsteater, Gottsunda Teatern, Norrbottensteatern, Stockholm City Theatre, Dálvadis and Samiska Teatern. In recent years, she has worked at Gävle Folk Theater. In Spring 2009, she took office as Culture and Recreation Manager of Jokkmokk Municipality.

Nordlund has dramatized 14 plays and herself written seven of them. She was the artistic director of Teatergruppen Dálvadis from 1971 to 1985 and Beaivváš Sámi Našunálateáhter in Kautokeino, Norway from 2002 to 2006. She hosted the program Sommar on Sveriges Radio P1 in August 1990.

Nordlund lived with Gustav Levin in the 80's and 90's and they have two daughters together (born 1982 and 1985 respectively).

Selected filmography 
1975: Långtradarchaufförens berättelser
1991: Önskas
1997: Hästen och tranan
1997: In the Presence of a Clown

References

External links
 
 Swedish Film Database

1954 births
Living people
People from Jokkmokk Municipality
Swedish Sámi people
Swedish film actresses
Swedish stage actresses
Swedish television actresses